The Dainichi Formation is a palaeontological formation located in Shizuoka, Japan. The formation is part of the Kakegawa Group.  It dates to the Upper Pliocene period. The shell beds in the Dainichi formation contain molluscan fossils, including those of the Rhizoconus hyaena.

See also 
 List of fossil sites

References

Further reading 
  (1993); Wildlife of Gondwana. Reed. 

Geologic formations of Japan
Neogene System of Asia
Neogene Japan
Pliocene Series
Pliocene paleontological sites
Paleontology in Japan